Čovječe ne ljuti se is the debut album by a Croatian hip hop duo, Tram 11. The album was released in 1999 and had a major success. The album features production from Koolade and Dash and guest appearances on the album include El Bahattee, Phat Phillie, Major League Figures, Sick Rhyme Sayazz, Don Dovbje and Kiki. Some tracks (ex. "Kaj Ima Lima?") contain introductional inserts performed by Baby Dooks (of Sick Rhyme Sayazz) but he was not credited for that.

Track listing

Tram 11 albums
1999 albums